Jimei University (JMU) (Pinyin: ,), colloquially known as "Jídà", is a public university in Xiamen, Fujian, People's Republic of China.It offers doctorate degree programs. It is authorized to enroll postgraduate candidates exempt from admission exam and enrolls students from all over the country.

History
Founded by Tan Kah Kee in 1918, Jimei University traces its origins back to Jimei Normal School.

In 1994, Jimei University was the result of combining five institutes and colleges in the "Jimei Schools Village": Fujian Physical Education College, Jimei Finance and Economics Institute, Jimei Navigation Institute, Jimei Teachers College, and Xiamen Fisheries College.

Faculties
Jimei University has a total 2300 faculties and more than 1,500 full-time teachers, among whom more than 800 are professors and associate professors and approximately 30-40 are foreign teachers. The University has a high-level teaching and research team, including 39 professors who enjoy the State Council Special Subsidies, 1 awardee of the National Millions of Talents Project and 12 Distinguished Professor's Award in Minjiang Scholar's Program. Other recognition awards include 115 winners and 5 scientific teams of various ministerial and provincial high-tech talents program, such as the Excellent Talent of Fujian, Outstanding Science and Technology Talents, Scientific Innovation Leading Talents, Philosophy and Social Science Leading Talents, Youth Science and Technology Awards, and Scientific Innovation Team of Fujian Higher Education Institutes. Besides, the specialty of Fisheries of the University has been selected in the project of the Highland of Talents for Social Offices and Enterprises of Fujian Province.

Academic research
After a long period of practice, the University has shaped its ocean-oriented engineering subjects such as Maritime and Fisheries to its advantage. Maritime Education has a significant impact at home and abroad and it has become the “breeding ground” fostering senior maritime professionals. The 64,000dwt vessel- or  ‘Yude’ is regarded the biggest ocean-going ship of the world for students to gain onboard practice. The university has 2 local and national joint engineering research centers, 13 provincial (ministerial) level scientific research innovation platforms and research base of humanities and social sciences, 1 provincial university characteristic new type of font stock as well as 13 provincial university innovation platforms/ research bases. The University has undertaken several national research programs, such as ‘973 Program’, ‘863 Program’, the National Natural Science Fund Program, and the National Social Science Fund Program. It has won over 40 scientific and technological progress awards from the provincial and national levels. The University actively carries out collaborative innovations and takes its lead to set up the ‘Fujian Yacht Industry Key Technology Collaborative Innovation Center’, participates in the establishment of the “ Fujian Collaborative Innovation Center for Exploitation and Utilization of Maritime and Biological Resources”. It has also set up about 50 research platforms with enterprises.

Key Laboratories and Projects
 National and Local Joint Engineering Research Center of Deep Processing Technology for Aquatic products 
 Key Laboratory of Healthy Mariculture for the East China Sea, Ministry of Agriculture 
 National-local Joint Engineering Research Center for Marine Navigation Aids Services 
 Engineering Research Center of the Modern Industry Technology for Eel. Ministry of Education

Students
Jimei University has over 27,000 students where more than 25,600 are full-time undergraduate students and over 1400 are master's degree or various postgraduate program students. There are about 600 overseas students in the University. The University has 3 national professional comprehensive reform pilot projects, 6 national ‘Outstanding Talents’ training projects, 4 national specialized majors, 1 national level teaching team, 2 national experimental teaching demonstration centers, 1 national virtual stimulation experimental teaching center, 1 national internship education base for university students, 11 provincial specialized specialty training bases and professional comprehensive reform pilot bases, 8 provincial service-centered majors, 6 provincial innovation entrepreneurship education reform pilot disciplines, 7 provincial level teaching teams, 16 provincial experimental teaching demonstration centers and 2 provincial virtual stimulation experimental teaching centers. Besides, students have achieved high ranks in many competitions such as the national university students ‘Challenge Cup’, the mathematical modeling, the National Robot Contest, the smart car contest,  the National Games, the National University Games and other major competitions as well. The graduates have received compliments from the society and the employment rate in the past 3 years has remained above 95%.

Campuses
The university has an area of more than 2300 mu (1mu=666.7m2), with a floor space of over 1,020,000 square meters. It is known for its scenery and the distinctive ‘Jiageng-style’ architectural design, of which eight buildings have been selected as ‘The National Key Cultural Relics Protection Buildings’. The architectural complex of the new campus was elected one of the ‘100 Elite Construction Projects’ for over the 60 years since the founding of the People's Republic of China. Jimei University is the only university winning the award.

Jimei University has several libraries; Jiageng Library and Cheng Yankui Library are the biggest.

Colleges and schools
Jimei University has an integration of 21 colleges. It has formed a multi-disciplined school-running system and offers 68 undergraduate courses in 9 disciplines, namely, Economics, Law, Pedagogy, Arts, Science, Engineering, Agronomy, Administration, and Fine Arts. There are 8 first class provincial disciplines (including 2 characteristic key disciplines), 1 postdoctoral research station of Fisheries, 2 first level doctorate programs in Fisheries and Naval Architecture and Ocean. In addition, there are 9 first-level master's degree authorization disciplines in Fisheries, Naval Architecture and Ocean, Food Science and Engineering, Communication and Transportation, Applied Economics, Sports Science, Mathematics, Chinese Language and Literature, and Biology. Altogether, it offers 4 professional master's courses in the fields of Agronomy, Engineering, Pedagogy and Taxation.

Arts and Humanities 
 Marxist Institute
 Teachers Education College
 School of Political Science and Law
 School of Chinese Language and Literature
 Arts College
 School of Foreign Languages
 Physical Education College

Commerce 
 School of Business Administration
 Finance and Economic College

Technology and Engineering
 Computer Engineering College
 Information Engineering College
 College of Mechanical and Energy Engineering
 Food and Biological Engineering College
 Marine Engineering Institute

General Sciences
 Fisheries College
 Navigation College
 Science College
 Engineering Technology College
 Adult Education College
 Overseas Education College
 Chengyi College

Administration
Administration Office; Discipline Inspection, Supervision and Auditing Office; Organization Department; Publicity Department; United Front Work Department; Student Affairs Department; Development and Planning Office; Personnel Office; International Cooperation and Exchange Department; Academic Affairs Department; Graduate Affairs Office; Enrollment Admission Department; Scientific Research Office; Security Department; Retirees' Affairs Department; Finance Department; Construction Bureau; Asset and Logistic Management Division; JMU Labor Union; JMU Youth Association; Engineering Training Center; Library; Network Center; Crew Education and Training Quality Management Center; Party School; Journal Editorial Department; Archive; Logistic Group; Property Management Ltd.

External exchange and cooperation
Jimei University is actively engaged in the external exchange and cooperation and takes full advantage of its regional location to the SoutheastAsia and being adjacent to Hong Kong, Macao and Taiwan Regions; the University gives its service to the Belt and Road initiative. The school has carried out a wide range of academic exchange and cooperation with more than 100 universities and research institutes from the United States, Britain, Australia, Hong Kong, Macao and Taiwan regions as well as the international organizations such as International Maritime  Organization, International Association of Lighthouse Authorities (IALA) and International Association of Maritime Universities. The school has established the strategic cooperation with Chinese Service Centre for Scholarly Exchange to build up the overseas study training base. Jimei University is one of the pioneer universities in Fujian to run the Sino- Foreign Joint Education Program, and the Cross-Strait joint Education Program. It is also a pioneer among Fujian institutions qualified to recruit students from Hong Kong, Macao, Taiwan, and overseas Chinese students. Furthermore, it is one of the universities authorized by Ministry of Education to receive students from Hong Kong Special Administrative Regions exempted from admission exams and to recruit students from Taiwan individually. It is one of the universities in Xiamen authorized to enroll overseas Chinese students  along the countries of ‘ Maritime Silk Road’ with Tan Kah Kee Scholarship. Jimei is a unique university in the mainland that is qualified to carry out the eligibility training and compliance transition period program for Taiwanese Seafarers in non-restricted waters, the only unit in Fujian for “The Funding Scheme for Youth Exchange in the Mainland” by Hong Kong SAR government. Being a main institute supported by Hanban (a public institution affiliated with the Chinese Ministry of Education) to provide Chinese language and culture teaching to the neighborhood countries and the first appointed Overseas Chinese education base’, the University has sent Chinese Volunteer Teachers to the ‘Belt and Road’ countries such as the Philippines, Thailand, Indonesia, and other countries ever since 2007.

References

External links

Official Website: 集美大学 
Jimei University 
Guide to Xiamen and Fujian (150+ web pages of text and photos)

Universities and colleges in Xiamen
Universities and colleges in Fujian
Educational institutions established in 1918
1918 establishments in China